The Halverson Canyon is a canyon in the U.S. state of Washington. The canyon is an offshoot of the Columbia River valley. The canyon is named after Halvor Halverson (an immigrant from Norway), who operated a lumber mill in the area.

Campground
There is a boat-in campground at the base of the canyon that is part of the Lake Roosevelt National Recreation Area

References

Canyons and gorges of Washington (state)
Landforms of Lincoln County, Washington
Protected areas of Lincoln County, Washington
Campgrounds in the United States